Andrej Grubačić is a Yugoslav world historian, world-systems theorist, and activist based in the United States.

Early life and education 

Grubačić was born in the Socialist Federal Republic of Yugoslavia. He is the grandson of Ratomir Dugonjić, former president of the Socialist Republic of Bosnia and Herzegovina and the Vice president of the  Socialist Federal Republic of Yugoslavia. Grubačić graduated from University of Belgrade and completed master's and doctoral degrees from the State University of New York at Binghamton.

Career 

Grubačić is a professor at the California Institute of Integral Studies and founded its Anthropology and Social Change department. Grubačić edits the Journal of World-Systems Research. He is an affiliated Faculty in Residence with the UC Berkeley Center for Social Medicine. After the premature death of his friend and colleague David Graeber,  Grubacic remains one of the very few prominent exponents of the anarchist Anthropology research perspective, and his Center in San Francisco is the only academic institute in the United States dedicated exclusively to the study of anarchist Anthropology  Living at the Edges of Capitalism, which Grubačić co-authored with Denis O'Hearn, won the 2017 American Sociological Association's Political Economy of the World-System Book Award.

His work is a synthesis of Braudelian history, Hegelian Marxism, and anarchist anthropology of Peter Kropotkin. Together with John Holloway and several other dissident academics, Grubacic has assembled a global federation of activist scholars and academic programs "inhabiting the cracks in academia".

He is a member of Retort collective, and has participated in grassroots alter-globalization movement and has supported international projects in Yugoslavia and Rojava. Since 2012, he has been writing about the revolution in Rojava and the imprisoned Kurdish leader Abdullah Ocalan. As a professor at the University of Rojava, and social science editor at PM Press, he is responsible for a number of books on Kurdish struggle published in English language.

Books 
 Grubačić, Andrej, & O'Hearn, Denis (2016). Living at the edges of capitalism: Adventures in exile and mutual aid. University of California Press. .

 Lynd, Staughton & Grubačić, Andrej (2010) From Here to There: The Staughton Lynd Reader. PM Press. 

 
 Noam Comski, Politika bez Moci. Izdavac: DAF Zagreb, 2004. .

References

External links 

 

 

21st-century Serbian historians
Historians of anarchism
Anarchist theorists
Industrial Workers of the World members
Yugoslav emigrants to the United States
Living people
Serbian anarchists
University of Belgrade Faculty of Philosophy alumni
American sociologists
American people of Serbian descent
Year of birth missing (living people)